Durango Drive is a major north-south road in the Las Vegas metropolitan area, Nevada, United States, located on the west side of the city.

Route

Southern half
Durango Drive's southern terminus is at an intersection with Starr Avenue in Enterprise. From here, Durango Drive heads north and intersects with Blue Diamond Road (SR 160) followed by serving as a section line road dividing Spring Valley and Enterprise for one mile from Windmill Lane to Warm Springs Road. Entering Spring Valley, Durango Drive continues north to its first interchange with CC 215 (exit 17). Just north of this interchange is Nevada's first IKEA furniture store, opened in 2016, and the future site of the UnCommons mixed-use development by Matter Real Estate. Durango Drive continues through Spring Valley before crossing into Las Vegas. Once in Las Vegas, Durango Drive crosses Charleston Boulevard before making an S-curve to the east, like most other major north-south grid roads in the Las Vegas metropolitan area west of I-15 do. After this, Durango Drive meets Summerlin Parkway (SR 613) at an interchange before the northern terminus of Durango Drive's southern segment at Vegas Drive.

Northern half
The southern terminus of Durango Drive's northern segment is at an intersection with Cheyenne Avenue. Here, Durango Drive's roadway continues south as Rampart Boulevard into the Summerlin neighborhood. Heading north, Durango Drive meets its second interchange with CC 215 (exit 37) before another interchange, this time with US 95 (exit 93). Farther north, Durango Drive intersects Brent Lane, which provides access to Tule Springs Road and Floyd Lamb Park at Tule Springs, before reaching its northern terminus at an intersection with Moccasin Road on the border between Las Vegas and Tule Springs Fossil Beds National Monument.

Major intersections

Buildings and parks along Durango Drive
The following locations are sorted from south to north.

Buildings
 IKEA Las Vegas
 Centennial Hills Hospital

Parks

 Mountain's Edge Regional Park (nearby, along Mountain's Edge Parkway)
 Desert Breeze Park
 Angel Park
 Angel Park Golf Club
 Las Vegas Sports Park (nearby, along Rampart Boulevard)
 Durango Hills Park
 Durango Hills Golf Club
 Mountain Crest Park
 Raptor Play Park
 Viper Lacrosse Fields
 Tule Springs
 Tule Springs Ranch
 Floyd Lamb Park at Tule Springs
 Tule Springs Fossil Beds National Monument (nearby, accessible from Moccasin Road)

References

Streets in Las Vegas
Streets in the Las Vegas Valley
Spring Valley, Nevada
Enterprise, Nevada